Smail is a mail transfer agent used on Unix-like operating systems.

Smail may also refer to:
 Snail mail, a disparaging retronym referring to missives carried by conventional postal delivery services
 Robert Smail's Printing Works, a Victorian-era letterpress printing works in the Scottish Borders town of Innerleithen

People with the surname 
 David Smail (golfer) (born 1970), New Zealand professional golfer
 David Smail (psychologist) (born 1938), British clinical psychologist
 Doug Smail (born 1957), Canadian ice hockey left winger
 John R.W. Smail (1930-2002), Cornell historian of Southeast Asia
 Thomas Smail (born 1928), Scottish theologian